Alan Alda (born Alphonso Joseph D'Abruzzo; January 28, 1936) is an American actor, screenwriter, and director. A six-time Emmy Award and Golden Globe Award winner and a three-time Tony Award nominee, he is best known for playing Captain Benjamin "Hawkeye" Pierce in the CBS wartime sitcom M*A*S*H (1972–1983). He also wrote and directed numerous episodes of the series.

After starring in the films Same Time, Next Year (1978), California Suite (1978), and The Seduction of Joe Tynan (1979), he made his directorial film debut The Four Seasons (1981). Alda was nominated for the Academy Award for Best Supporting Actor for his portrayal of Owen Brewster in Martin Scorsese's The Aviator (2004). Other notable film roles include in Crimes and Misdemeanors (1989), Manhattan Murder Mystery (1993), Everyone Says I Love You (1996), Flirting with Disaster (1996), Tower Heist (2011), Bridge of Spies (2015), and Marriage Story (2019).

Alda won the Primetime Emmy Award for Outstanding Supporting Actor in a Drama Series for his role as Senator Arnold Vinick in the NBC series The West Wing. Other Emmy-nominated roles include in And the Band Played On in 1993, ER in 2000, 30 Rock in 2009, and The Blacklist in 2015. He also had recurring roles in The Big C (2011–2013), Horace and Pete (2016), Ray Donovan (2018–2020), and The Good Fight (2018–2019).

Alda has also received three Tony Award nominations for his Broadway performances in The Apple Tree (1967), Jake's Women (1992), and Glengarry Glen Ross (2005). In 2008 he received a Grammy Award for Best Audio Book, Narration & Storytelling Recording nomination for Things I Overheard While Talking to Myself. In 2019, Alda received the Screen Actors Guild Life Achievement Award.

Early life 
Alda was born Alphonso Joseph D'Abruzzo on January 28, 1936, in the Bronx, New York City. Alda spent his childhood with his parents travelling around the United States in support of his father's job as a performer in burlesque theatres. His father Robert Alda (born Alfonso Giuseppe Giovanni Roberto D'Abruzzo) was an actor and singer, and his mother Joan Browne was a homemaker and former beauty-pageant winner. His father was of Italian descent (D'Abruzzo is a toponymic surname) and his mother was of Irish ancestry.

When Alda was seven years old, he contracted polio. To combat the disease, his parents administered a painful treatment regimen developed by Sister Elizabeth Kenny, consisting of applying hot woollen blankets to his limbs and stretching his muscles. Alda attended Archbishop Stepinac High School in White Plains, New York. He studied English at Fordham University in the Bronx, where he was a student staff member of its FM radio station, WFUV. During Alda's junior year, he studied in Paris, acted in a play in Rome, and performed with his father on television in Amsterdam.

In 1956, Alda received his Bachelor of Arts degree. A member of the ROTC, he entered the United States Army Reserve and served for a year at Fort Benning, then six months as a gunnery officer in Korea. In a 2013 interview, Alda joked that he was actually in charge of a mess tent.

Alda's half-brother Antony Alda was born in 1956 and also became an actor.

Career

Early acting 
Alda began his career in the 1950s, as a member of the Compass Players, an improvisational, comedy revue directed by Paul Sills. He later became a member of the improvisational group Second City in Chicago. He joined the acting company at the Cleveland Play House during the 1958–1959 season as part of a grant from the Ford Foundation, appearing in productions such as To Dorothy a Son, Heaven Come Wednesday, Monique, and Job. In 1958 Alda appeared as Carlyle Thompson III on The Phil Silvers Show in the episode titled "Bilko the Art Lover". In the November 1964 world premiere at the ANTA Playhouse of the stage version of The Owl and The Pussycat, he played Felix the "Owl" opposite the "Pussycat" which was played by actress/singer Diana Sands, an African-American actress with whom he shared an onstage kiss, for which he received hate mail.  He continued to play Felix the "Owl" for the 1964–65 Broadway season. In 1966, he starred in the musical The Apple Tree on Broadway, with Barbara Harris. He was nominated for the Tony Award as Best Actor in a Musical for that role.

Alda said he became a Mainer in 1957 when he played at the Kennebunkport Playhouse.

Alda was part of the cast, along with David Frost, Henry Morgan and Buck Henry, of the American television version of That Was The Week That Was, which ran as a series from January 10, 1964, to May 1965. He made his Hollywood acting debut as a supporting player in Gone Are the Days! – a film version of the Broadway play Purlie Victorious, which co-starred Ruby Dee and her husband, Ossie Davis. Other film roles followed, such as his portrayal of author, humorist, and actor George Plimpton in the film Paper Lion (1968), as well as The Extraordinary Seaman (1969), and the occult-murder-suspense thriller The Mephisto Waltz, with actresses Jacqueline Bisset and Barbara Parkins. During this time, Alda frequently appeared as a panelist on the 1968 revival of What's My Line?. He also appeared as a panelist on I've Got a Secret during its 1972 syndication revival.

Alda also wrote several of the stories and poems that appeared in Marlo Thomas' television show Free to Be... You and Me.

1972–1983: M*A*S*H 

In early 1972, Alda auditioned for and was selected to play the role of Hawkeye Pierce in the TV adaptation of the 1970 film M*A*S*H. He was nominated for 21 Emmy Awards, and won five. He took part in writing 19 episodes, including the 1983 2.5-hour series finale "Goodbye, Farewell and Amen", which was also the 32nd episode he directed. It remains the single most-watched episode of any American broadcast network television series. Alda was the only series regular to appear in all 256 episodes.

Alda commuted from Los Angeles to his home in New Jersey every weekend for 11 years while starring in M*A*S*H. His wife and daughters lived in New Jersey and he did not want to move his family to Los Angeles, initially because he did not know how long the show would last.

Alda's father, Robert Alda, and half-brother Antony Alda appeared together in the 20th episode of season eight of M*A*S*H, "Lend a Hand". Robert had previously appeared in "The Consultant" in season three.

During the first five seasons of the series, the tone of M*A*S*H was largely that of a traditional "service comedy", in the vein of shows such as McHale's Navy. However, as the original writers gradually left the series, Alda gained increasing control, and by the final seasons had become a producer and creative consultant. Under his watch, M*A*S*H retained its comedic foundation, but gradually assumed a somewhat more serious tone, openly addressing political issues. As a result, the 11 years of M*A*S*H are generally split into two eras: the Larry Gelbart/Gene Reynolds "comedy" years (1972–1977), and the Alan Alda "dramatic" years (1977–1983). Alda disagreed with this assessment. In a 2016 interview he stated, "I don't like to write political messages. I don't like plays that have political messages. I do not think I am responsible for that."

Alda and his co-stars Wayne Rogers and McLean Stevenson worked well together during the first three seasons, but over time tensions developed as Alda's role grew in popularity and disrupted the original 'equal' standing of their characters. Rogers and Stevenson both left the show at the end of the third season. Anticipating the fourth season, Alda and the producers sought a replacement actor for the surrogate parent role embodied in the character Colonel Blake. They found veteran actor Harry Morgan, a fan of the series who starred as Colonel Sherman T. Potter, a character who  carried on as one of the show's lead protagonists. Mike Farrell was introduced as Hawkeye's new tentmate BJ Hunnicutt.

In his 1981 autobiography, Jackie Cooper (who directed several early episodes) wrote that Alda concealed a lot of hostility beneath the surface, and that the two of them barely spoke to each other by the time Cooper's directing of M*A*S*H ended.

During his M*A*S*H years, Alda made several game-show appearances, most notably in The $10,000 Pyramid and as a frequent panelist on What's My Line? and To Tell the Truth. He also wrote and starred, in the title role, in the 1979 political drama film The Seduction of Joe Tynan.

His favorite episodes of M*A*S*H are "Dear Sigmund" and "In Love and War".

In 1996, Alda was ranked 41st on TV Guides 50 Greatest TV Stars of All Time.

Writing and directing credits 
The following is a list of M*A*S*H episodes written and/or directed by Alda.

1980s 
Alda's prominence in M*A*S*H provided him a platform to speak out on political topics. He has been a strong and vocal supporter of women's rights and the feminist movement. He co-chaired, with former First Lady Betty Ford, the Equal Rights Amendment Countdown campaign. In 1976, The Boston Globe dubbed him "the quintessential Honorary Woman: a feminist icon" for his activism on behalf of the Equal Rights Amendment.

Alda played Nobel Prize–winning physicist Richard Feynman in the play QED, which had only one other character. Although Peter Parnell wrote the play, Alda both produced and inspired it. Alda has also appeared frequently in the films of Woody Allen, and was a guest star five times on ER, playing Dr. Kerry Weaver's mentor, Gabriel Lawrence. During the later episodes, Lawrence was revealed to be in the early stages of Alzheimer's disease. Alda also had a co-starring role as Dr. Robert Gallo in the 1993 TV movie And the Band Played On.

During M*A*S*Hs run and continuing through the 1980s, Alda embarked on a successful career as a writer and director, with the ensemble dramedy, The Four Seasons being perhaps his most notable hit. Betsy's Wedding is his last directing credit to date. After M*A*S*H, Alda took on a series of roles that either parodied or directly contradicted his "nice guy" image. He then partnered with producer Martin Bregman on various films, first with an agreement at Universal Pictures in 1983, then it was moved to Lorimar Motion Pictures in 1986.

1990s 

Alda has frequently appeared in the films of his friend, Woody Allen, including Crimes and Misdemeanors (1989), Manhattan Murder Mystery (1993) and Everyone Says I Love You (1996). When asked about the controversy surrounding Allen in 2019, Alda stated, "I'd work with him again if he wanted me. I'm not qualified to judge him... I just don't have enough information to convince me I shouldn't work with him. And he's an enormously talented guy."

From the fall season of 1993 until the show ended in 2005, Alda was the host for Scientific American Frontiers, which began on PBS in 1990.

In 1995, he starred as the President of the United States in Michael Moore's political satire/comedy film Canadian Bacon. Around this time, rumors circulated that Alda was considering running for the United States Senate in New Jersey, but he denied this. In 1996, Alda played Henry Ford, founder of the Ford Motor Company, in Camping With Henry and Tom, based on the book by Mark St. Germain and appeared in the comedy film, Flirting with Disaster. In 1997 Alda played National Security Adviser Alvin Jordan In Murder at 1600. In 1999, Alda portrayed Dr. Gabriel Lawrence in NBC program ER for five episodes and was nominated for Primetime Emmy Award for Outstanding Guest Actor in a Drama Series.

Alda starred in the original Broadway production of the play Art, which opened on March 1, 1998, at the Bernard B. Jacobs Theatre. The play won the Tony Award for Best Play.

2000s 
Beginning in 2004, Alda was a regular cast member on the NBC program The West Wing, portraying California Republican U.S. Senator and presidential candidate Arnold Vinick, until the show's conclusion in May 2006. He made his premiere in the sixth season's eighth episode, "In The Room", and was added to the opening credits with the 13th episode, "King Corn". In August 2006, Alda won an Emmy for his portrayal of Vinick in the final season of The West Wing. Alda appeared in a total of 28 episodes during the show's sixth and seventh seasons. Alda had been a serious candidate, along with Sidney Poitier, for the role of President Josiah Bartlet before Martin Sheen was ultimately cast in the role.

In 2004, Alda portrayed conservative Maine Senator Owen Brewster in Martin Scorsese's Academy Award-winning film The Aviator, in which he co-starred with Leonardo DiCaprio. Alda received his first Academy Award nomination for this role in 2005.

Alda also had a part in the 2000 romantic comedy What Women Want, as the CEO of the advertising firm where the main characters worked.

In early 2005, Alda starred as Shelly Levene in the Tony Award-winning Broadway revival of David Mamet's Glengarry Glen Ross, for which he received a Tony Award nomination for Best Featured Actor in a Play. Throughout 2009 and 2010, he appeared in three episodes of 30 Rock as Milton Greene, the biological father of Jack Donaghy, played by Alec Baldwin. In January 2010, Alda hosted The Human Spark, a three-part series originally broadcast on PBS discussing the nature of human uniqueness and recent studies on the human brain.

In 2006, Alda contributed his voice to a part in the audio book of Max Brooks' World War Z. In this book, he voiced Arthur Sinclair, Jr., the director of the United States government's fictional Department of Strategic Resources (DeStRes).

2010s 
Alda returned to Broadway in November 2014, playing the role of Andrew Makepeace in the revival of Love Letters at the Brooks Atkinson Theater alongside Candice Bergen.

In 2015, Alda appeared as a lawyer, Thomas Watters, alongside Tom Hanks as James Donovan, in Steven Spielberg's critically acclaimed cold war drama film Bridge of Spies which received an Academy Award nomination for Best Picture.

In 2016, Alda gained critical praise for his performance in Louis C.K.'s acclaimed web-based series Horace and Pete as the irascible Uncle Pete. IndieWire critic Sam Adams described as "his best role in years". In regards to C.K.'s recent scandal, Alda stated, "I respect Louis so much as an artist. But he did a terrible thing, and I hope he finds a way to come to terms with both of those things."

Also in 2016, Alda took part in the opening night show of John Mulaney and Nick Kroll's Oh, Hello at the Lyceum Theatre on Broadway. The show is said to be inspired by "two old men at the Strand buying a copy of Alda's book". Before bringing Alda onstage, Mulaney said, "This is genuinely the best guest we ever had."

In 2018, Alda began portraying psychiatrist Dr. Arthur Amiot in Season 6 of Showtime's Ray Donovan.

In 2019, Alda appeared in Noah Baumbach's thirteenth film, Marriage Story, as a warm-hearted lawyer who represents a stage director (Adam Driver) during the divorce proceedings. In an interview with The Wall Street Journal, Alda discussed the effects of his illness, mainly Parkinson's disease, and other related issues. He stated, "I have this tremor. It's not part of the script so I didn't want it to be distracting if Noah thought it would be distracting." Alda has received widespread acclaim for his performance.

Charitable works 
Alda has done extensive charity work. He helped narrate a 2005 St. Jude Children's Hospital-produced one-hour special TV show Fighting for Life. His wife, Arlene, and he are also close friends of Marlo Thomas, who is very active in fund-raising for the hospital that her father, Danny Thomas founded. The television special featured Ben Bowen as one of six patients being treated for childhood cancer at Saint Jude. Alda and Marlo Thomas had also worked together in the early 1970s on a critically acclaimed children's album entitled Free to Be You and Me, which featured Alda, Thomas, and a number of other well-known character actors. This project remains one of the earliest public signs of his support of women's rights.  Alda chaired "Men for the Equal Rights Amendment" and was appointed to the International Women's Year Commission.

Communicating science 
For 14 years, he served as the host of Scientific American Frontiers, a television show that explored cutting-edge advances in science and technology. In 2010, he became a visiting professor at Stony Brook University.  In 2009, he was a founder of the university's Alan Alda Center for Communicating Science.  He continues as a member of its advisory board.  He is also on the advisory board of the Future of Life Institute. He serves on the board of the World Science Festival and is a judge for Math-O-Vision.

Alda also has an avid interest in cosmology, and participated in BBC coverage of the opening of the Large Hadron Collider, at CERN, Geneva, in September 2008.

He was named an Honorary Fellow by the Society for Technical Communication in 2014 for his work with the Center for Communicating Science and the annual Flame Challenge. Alda would like to use his expertise in acting and communication to help scientists communicate more effectively to the public. In 2014 Alda was awarded the American Chemical Society's James T. Grady-James H. Stack Award for Interpreting Chemistry for the Public for his work in science communication. He was awarded the National Academy of Sciences Public Welfare Medal in 2016 "for his extraordinary application of the skills honed as an actor to communicating science on television and stage, and by teaching scientists innovative techniques that allow them to tell their stories to the public".

In 2011 Alda wrote Radiance: The Passion of Marie Curie, a full-length play that focuses on Marie Skłodowska Curie's professional and personal life during the time between the Nobel Prizes won by her for physics and chemistry, from 1903 to 1911.

On 18 February 2021, he received the Kavli Foundation's first-ever Distinguished Kavli Science Communicator award for his pioneering work in communicating the excitement, mystery and marvels of science.

Personal life 

In 1956, while attending Fordham, Alda met Arlene Weiss, who was attending Hunter College. They bonded at a mutual friend's dinner party; when a rum cake accidentally fell onto the kitchen floor, they were the only two guests who did not hesitate to eat it. After a screenshot of this Wikipedia article went viral, he addressed the incident saying "We did eat the rum cake off the floor and were inseparable after that. But I was captivated by her even earlier in the meal when I heard her at the end of the table laughing at my jokes. She had me at Ha." A year after his graduation, on March 15, they were married. They have three daughters: Eve, Elizabeth, and Beatrice. Two of his eight grandchildren are aspiring actors. Arlene sometimes calls him "Fonzi" in reference to his birth name "Alphonso".

The Aldas were long-time residents of Leonia, New Jersey. Alda frequented Sol & Sol Deli on Palisade Avenue in the nearby town of Englewood, New Jersey—a fact mirrored in his character's daydream about eating whitefish from the establishment in an episode of M*A*S*H in which Hawkeye sustains a head injury.

In Things I Overheard While Talking to Myself, Alda described how as a teen he was raised as a Roman Catholic and eventually he realized he had begun thinking like an agnostic or atheist. While he states that he still prays on occasion, he said he wants to find meaning in this life rather than worrying about the next one. He states that when he talks to God it often comes at times of fear rather than out of a sense of belief. Furthermore, he does not like to be labeled as an agnostic, stating in an interview for the 2008 question section of the Edge Foundation website, that it was too fancy a word for him. He argues he simply is not a believer and questions why people are so frightened of others who hold beliefs different from their own.

On July 31, 2018, he appeared on CBS This Morning and announced he had been diagnosed with Parkinson's disease three years earlier.

Memoirs 

In 2005, Alda published his first round of memoirs, Never Have Your Dog Stuffed: and Other Things I've Learned. Among other stories, he recalls his intestines becoming strangulated while on location in La Serena, Chile, for his PBS show Scientific American Frontiers, during which he mildly surprised a young doctor with his understanding of medical procedures, which he had learned from M*A*S*H. He also talks about his mother's battle with schizophrenia. The title comes from an incident in his childhood, when Alda was distraught about his dog dying and his well-meaning father had the animal stuffed. Alda was horrified by the results, and took from this that sometimes we have to accept things as they are, rather than desperately and fruitlessly trying to change them.

His second memoir, Things I Overheard While Talking to Myself, (2008), weaves together advice from public speeches he has given with personal recollections about his life and beliefs.

His third memoir, If I Understood You, Would I Have This Look on My Face? My Adventures in the Art and Science of Relating and Communicating, (2017), is a story of his quest to learn how to communicate better, and to teach others to do the same.

Filmography

Film

Television

Stage

Awards and nominations 

Academy Awards

Tony Awards

Grammy Awards

Primetime Emmy Awards

British Academy Film Awards

Golden Globe Award

Screen Actors Guild Awards

Other Awards
 Directors Guild of America Award for Outstanding Directorial – Comedy Series in 1983 for M*A*S*H "Where There's a Will, There's a War"
 Directors Guild of America Award for Outstanding Directorial – Comedy Series in 1982 for M*A*S*H: "The Life You Save"
 Directors Guild of America Award for Outstanding Directorial – Comedy Series in 1977 for M*A*S*H: "Dear Sigmund"
 National Board of Review Award for Best Supporting Actor – in 1989 for Crimes and Misdemeanors
 New York Film Critics Circle Award for Best Supporting Actor – in 1989 for Crimes and Misdemeanors
 Induction into the Television Hall of Fame in 1994
 Drama Desk Award for Outstanding Ensemble Performance in 2005 for Glengarry Glen Ross
 Inducted into the New Jersey Hall of Fame in 2014
2019 Distinguished Service Award from the National Association of Broadcasters
2021 Fellow of the American Association for the Advancement of Science (AAAS) – Section on General Interest in Science and Engineering

Honorary degrees 
Alan Alda has been awarded several honorary degrees in recognition of his acting career and promotion of educational initiatives. These include:

Works

References

External links 

 
 
 
 
 
 
  Alan Alda interview on BBC Radio 4 Desert Island Discs, November 1, 1991
 Alan Alda at TVArchive.ca

1936 births
Living people
20th-century American male actors
21st-century American male actors
American feminists
American male film actors
American male musical theatre actors
American male screenwriters
American male television actors
American memoirists
American people of Irish descent
American podcasters
American television directors
American television writers
American writers of Italian descent
Best Musical or Comedy Actor Golden Globe (television) winners
Directors Guild of America Award winners
Fellows of the American Academy of Arts and Sciences
Film directors from California
Archbishop Stepinac High School alumni
Fordham University alumni
Former Roman Catholics
International Emmy Founders Award winners
Male actors from New York City
American male television writers
Male feminists
Military personnel from New York City
Outstanding Performance by a Lead Actor in a Comedy Series Primetime Emmy Award winners
Outstanding Performance by a Supporting Actor in a Drama Series Primetime Emmy Award winners
People from Leonia, New Jersey
People from the Bronx
People with Parkinson's disease
People with polio
People from White Plains, New York
Stony Brook University faculty
United States Army officers
Film directors from New York City
Film directors from New Jersey
American male non-fiction writers
Screenwriters from New York (state)
Screenwriters from New Jersey
Screenwriters from California
United States Army reservists
WFUV people
Comedy film directors
American people of Italian descent
Military personnel from New Jersey
Fellows of the American Physical Society